The AEW Awards, also known as the AEW Dynamite Awards, are annual awards presented by All Elite Wrestling (AEW) to its professional wrestlers recognizing their accomplishments, along with the best and most viral moments from the preceding year. The inaugural edition took place on January 27, 2021. Fans cast votes online to decide the winners.

Awards

2021 
The 2021 award show, held on January 27, 2021, recognized the moments and accomplishments from October 2019—when AEW Dynamite first premiered—through the entire calendar year of 2020. The show was hosted by Tony Schiavone and special correspondent Dr. Britt Baker, D.M.D. The award winners were announced on the Bleacher Report app. Votes were cast through TNT's website. Shaquille O'Neal, Bert Kreischer, Chael Sonnen, Curtis Granderson, Camille Kostek, Kevin Heffernan, Steve Lemme, Ron Funches, Danielle Fishel, and Jensen Karp presented the awards virtually.

Winners are listed first, highlighted in boldface. Dates listed are for 2020 unless otherwise noted.

2022 
The 2022 award show, which aired on AEW's YouTube channel on March 23, 2022, recognized the moments and accomplishments for the entire calendar year of 2021. The show was hosted by Tony Schiavone, with co-hosts Dr. Britt Baker, D.M.D., Scorpio Sky, and Ethan Page.

Winners are listed first, highlighted in boldface. Dates listed are for 2021.

See also 
 List of professional wrestling awards

References

External links 
 

All Elite Wrestling
Awards established in 2021
Professional wrestling awards